Omorgus crotchi is a species of hide beetle in the subfamily Omorginae.

References

crotchi
Beetles described in 1871